Moravice may refer to:

Croatia
Moravice, Croatia, a village in the Primorje-Gorski Kotar County
Brod Moravice, a municipality in the Primorje-Gorski Kotar County

Czech Republic
Moravice, Czech Republic, a municipality and village in the Moravian-Silesian Region
Moravice (river), a tributary river of the Opava
Dolní Moravice, a municipality and village in the Moravian-Silesian Region

See also
Moravica (disambiguation)